Kyle Joseph George Lafferty (born 16 September 1987) is a Northern Irish professional footballer who currently plays for NIFL Premiership club Linfield  and the Northern Ireland national team.

Lafferty began his professional career with English side Burnley, where he made 89 appearances. He signed for Rangers in 2008 for £3.25 million and won three Scottish Premier League titles, the Scottish Cup once and the Scottish League Cup twice with the club. In 2012 Lafferty chose not to transfer over to the new company, moving to Switzerland's FC Sion. He signed for Serie B club Palermo in 2013 and led them to promotion as champions in his only season before joining Norwich City. He spent time on loan with Turkish club Çaykur Rizespor and back in England with Birmingham City. After just over a year back in Scotland with Heart of Midlothian, Lafferty re-signed for Rangers in August 2018, and he has since had short spells with Sarpsborg 08, Sunderland, Reggina, Kilmarnock and Anorthosis Famagusta. In January 2022, he returned to Kilmarnock, joining the club for the second time.

He made his first international appearance for Northern Ireland in 2006 and has more than 80 caps, representing the team at UEFA Euro 2016. With 20 goals he is the team's second highest scorer of all time, behind former strike partner David Healy on 36.

Club career

Burnley
In 2004, Lafferty signed a youth team apprenticeship with Championship club Burnley. The following season saw him begin to make an impression upon the Burnley first team. He made his debut during a 2–1 away league defeat to Crewe Alexandra on 6 August 2005, coming on as an 89th-minute substitute for Garreth O'Connor.

In January 2006, Lafferty joined Darlington on loan. He went on to make nine appearances and net three goals for the club, including a scoring debut against Notts County on 7 January. He returned to Burnley in January 2007.

He scored his first senior goal for Burnley against Luton Town, netting the equaliser for a 1–1 draw on 30 April 2006. Lafferty played 89 times and scored 10 goals during his time at Burnley.

Rangers
On 16 June 2008, Burnley accepted a bid from Rangers of £3 million plus Alan Gow but talks with Gow over his move to Turf Moor broke down. Lafferty moved to Rangers on 19 June after the transfer offer was readjusted to write Gow out of the deal. He made his Rangers debut as an 89th-minute substitute during a UEFA Champions League qualifier on 5 August 2008 against FBK Kaunas. His first goal came in his second appearance, in a Scottish Premier League match against Heart of Midlothian on 16 August 2008.

On 16 May 2009, during the penultimate league match of the 2008–09 season at home to Aberdeen, Lafferty was involved in an off-the-ball altercation with Aberdeen player Charlie Mulgrew which ended with Lafferty reacting as if he had been headbutted. The referee, Stuart Dougal, sent Mulgrew off for violent conduct; however, television pictures showed little contact between the two players. Rangers went on to win the match 2–1. Upon reviewing the incident Rangers manager Walter Smith expressed his disappointment at Lafferty's conduct. Two days later it was reported that Rangers had fined Lafferty for his reactions in relation to the incident. The case was also referred to the Scottish Football Association's disciplinary committee, who rescinded Mulgrew's red card and gave Lafferty a two-match ban for simulation.

On 25 April 2010, Lafferty scored the winning goal in a 1–0 win over Hibernian at Easter Road, securing the league title for Rangers with three matches left to play. On 22 August, Lafferty was sent off, along with opponent Kevin McBride, in a match at the same venue. On 25 September, Lafferty scored his first hat-trick for the club in a 7–2 victory over Dunfermline Athletic in the League Cup. Lafferty scored in Rangers' 4–0 win over Dundee United in April 2011, before missing an opportunity in the final Old Firm game of the 2010–11 season at Ibrox in a 0–0 draw. Lafferty then went on to score in three consecutive games in the title run in against Motherwell, Hearts and Dundee United. Lafferty then scored a hat-trick in the final SPL game of the season as Rangers beat Kilmarnock 5–1 and won their third consecutive league title.

On 18 September 2011, Lafferty scored his first Old Firm goal in a 4–2 win against Celtic. On 17 December, Lafferty scored an 83rd-minute winner for Rangers against Inverness Caledonian Thistle, the game ending 2–1. On 24 April 2012, Ally McCoist announced that Lafferty had been banned for two weeks following a training ground bust up.

In June 2012, Lafferty lodged an objection against his contract being transferred from Rangers to the new company set up by Charles Green. PFA Scotland had previously commented that players were entitled to become free agents if they objected to the transfer. Lafferty later raised a constructive dismissal claim against Rangers.

Sion
Lafferty signed a three-year contract with Swiss Super League club FC Sion on 30 June 2012. He was unable to play in the league match against Grasshoppers on 15 July because the Scottish Football Association refused to provide clearance for the transfer, having received an objection from Rangers' owner Charles Green. On 20 July, Lafferty received provisional international clearance from FIFA which allowed him to play while arbitration over his move from Rangers continued. On 22 July 2012, Lafferty made his debut for Sion, coming on as a substitute in a 1–0 win over Servette. He scored his first goal a week later in a 3–0 win over Luzern.

Palermo
On 26 June 2013, Lafferty joined Serie B club Palermo on a three-year contract for an undisclosed fee. He said "Palermo tried to sign me in January but unfortunately we couldn't close the deal. Now I can't wait to get started. When I was younger I watched a lot of Italian football and I know there's a very passionate fanbase here at Palermo."

He scored 11 goals in 34 matches to help the club ascend to Serie A as champions in his only season, and won the Fans Player of the Season award. However, club president Maurizio Zamparini called him an "out-of-control womaniser" and claimed that this lifestyle resulted in him being sold.

Norwich City
On 27 June 2014, Lafferty signed a three-year contract with Norwich City of the Football League Championship with an option for an extra year. The transfer fee was undisclosed and the transfer would be effective from 1 July. He said "Norwich is a team that wants to get promoted back to the Premier League at the first opportunity, so I'm excited to come here and start playing football for a team like this." He was given squad number 9.

Lafferty made his debut for the team on 10 August, as they began the season with a 1–0 defeat away to Wolverhampton Wanderers, replacing Steven Whittaker for the last 14 minutes of the game. Six days later he made his first start in his first game at Carrow Road, lasting 67 minutes of a 3–0 win over Watford before being replaced by Elliott Bennett. In 20 games18 of those in the leaguehe only scored once, in a 3–2 home win against Cardiff City on 17 January 2015.

On 2 February 2015, Lafferty was loaned to Süper Lig club Çaykur Rizespor for the remainder of the campaign. He scored two goals in 14 league games for the Turkish side.

Norwich had been promoted to the Premier League during Lafferty's absence. He scored his first goal of the 2015–16 season in a 3–0 League Cup victory against West Bromwich Albion, but found regular games hard to come by. In November 2015, Leeds United head coach Steve Evans revealed he had inquired about the availability of Lafferty on loan. However, Lafferty remained with Norwich until 24 March 2016, when he joined Championship club Birmingham City on loan until the end of the season.

He returned from international duty with a groin injury, but was fit to start Birmingham's match against Brighton & Hove Albion on 5 April. He opened the scoring after 16 minutes with a tap-in following a goalkeeping error, but Brighton went on to win 2–1. He made five more league appearances, without scoring, in what remained of the season.

In May 2017, it was announced that Lafferty would be released when his contract expired.

Hearts
On 28 June 2017, Lafferty joined Heart of Midlothian in the Scottish Premiership on a two-year deal. He made his debut on 18 July in the group stage of the Scottish League Cup, scoring the only goal away to Elgin City. Two days later, he added two more goals in a 3–0 win over East Fife at Tynecastle, and on 25 July he made it four goals in three games with one in a 2–1 loss at Peterhead; Hearts did not reach the knockout stage.

In the league season, Lafferty scored 12 times as Hearts finished 6th; this made him the Premiership's fourth highest scorer. One of these was on 17 December 2017 in a 4–0 win over defending champions Celtic, ending their 69-match unbeaten run in domestic matches. Thirteen days later, he was sent off at the end of a goalless draw at Aberdeen for a challenge on Graeme Shinnie.

Return to Rangers
On 22 August 2018, Lafferty returned to Rangers for a second spell on a two-year deal. On his return to Rangers, Lafferty scored two goals in his league debut against Motherwell, a dramatic 3–3 draw. Lafferty left Rangers after having his contract terminated by mutual consent on 24 July 2019.

Sarpsborg 08
On 27 August 2019, Lafferty signed for Norwegian Eliteserien club Sarpsborg 08 on a contract until the end of the 2019 season.

Sunderland
Lafferty signed a short-term contract with Sunderland on 10 January 2020. He scored twice from 11 League One appearances before leaving the club when his contract expired.

Reggina
In July 2020, Lafferty moved to Italy to sign for Reggina. He scored once in nine Serie B matches and played twice in the Coppa Italia before being released by mutual consent in January 2021.

Kilmarnock
Lafferty returned to Scottish football in February 2021, signing a short-term contract with Kilmarnock. He had an immediate impact with Kilmarnock, scoring 12 goals in the space of eight games. This included a hat-trick in a 3–0 win against Dundee United on 21 April that lifted the club out of the relegation places. Kilmarnock eventually finished 11th and were relegated after they lost a play-off with Dundee. Lafferty left Kilmarnock at the end of his contract, having scored 13 goals in as many appearances for the club.

Anorthosis Famagusta 
Lafferty then signed a season-long deal with Cypriot club Anorthosis Famagusta. Lafferty agreed to mutually terminate his contract in December 2021.

Kilmarnock return 
On 21 January 2022, Lafferty returned to Kilmarnock, signing a deal until the end of the season.  This contract was subsequently extended until the summer of 2023.

Linfield 
On 8 February, Lafferty signed a short term deal with Irish League Champions Linfield until the end of the season.

International career
In early 2006, Lafferty represented Northern Ireland under-19s at the Milk Cup. He impressed during the tournament, scoring in his first game against Paraguay, but Northern Ireland lost the match 3–1.
Later in 2006, he received his first senior Northern Ireland call-up on a post-season trip to the United States to play friendly games against Romania and Uruguay. Lafferty scored his first Northern Ireland goal in an away friendly against Finland the following year. He featured predominantly as the second striker alongside David Healy during Northern Ireland's Euro 2008 qualification group, and he scored his first competitive international goal in a 4–1 victory over group minnows Liechtenstein. He then secured a 1–1 draw away to Sweden, scoring Northern Ireland's equaliser in the second half.

On 26 March 2008, he scored twice in an international match for the first time, in a friendly against Georgia which Northern Ireland won 4–1.

Lafferty scored in all of Northern Ireland's first three matches in UEFA Euro 2016 qualifying, against Hungary, the Faroe Islands and Greece, the first time that the nation won the first three matches of any qualification campaign. He added a brace on 29 March 2015 in a 2–1 home win over Finland.

On 4 September, Lafferty scored once for Northern Ireland in a 3–1 win against the Faroe Islands. The result put Northern Ireland at the top of Group F and on the brink of qualifying for their first European Championship. In the following game, against Hungary three days later, he scored a stoppage-time equaliser in a 1–1 draw to keep Northern Ireland top of their group. Lafferty ended the qualifying phase with seven goals, which made him Northern Ireland's top scorer as the team qualified as group winners. On 27 May 2016, Lafferty marked his 50th international appearance with a goal in a 3–0 win over Belarus in a friendly at Windsor Park, Belfast.

After Lafferty withdrew from the Northern Ireland squad for two UEFA Nations League matches in October 2018, the Irish Football Association invoked a FIFA rule to prevent him from playing for Rangers in their next league game.

Personal life
Lafferty was the victim of multiple counts of vandalism while at Rangers.

He married former Miss Scotland Nicola Mimnagh at St Margaret's Roman Catholic Church, in Johnstone, Renfrewshire, in June 2012. The couple had a son, born in 2011. They later divorced. Lafferty married model and former Miss Scotland contestant Vanessa Chung at Gleneagles Hotel in May 2016.
The couple had their first born daughter in 2018 and another daughter in 2020.

In August 2016, Lafferty accepted a misconduct charge from the Football Association in relation to football betting, and was fined £23,000.

In September 2022, Kilmarnock launched an investigation after video evidence emerged of Lafferty apparently making a sectarian remark in a nightclub.  He subsequently withdrew from the Northern Ireland squad preparing for two international matches.

Career statistics

Club statistics

International

Statistics

Goals
As of match played 5 September 2021
Northern Ireland score listed first, score column indicates score after each Lafferty goal

Honours
Rangers
Scottish Premier League (3): 2008–09, 2009–10, 2010–11
Scottish Cup: 2008–09
Scottish League Cup: 2009–10, 2010–11
Palermo
 Serie B: 2013–14
Kilmarnock

 Scottish Championship: 2021-22

References

External links

 
 Kyle Lafferty profile Irish FA
 NIFG profile

1987 births
Living people
Association footballers from Northern Ireland
Northern Ireland under-21 international footballers
Northern Ireland international footballers
Expatriate association footballers from Northern Ireland
Burnley F.C. players
Darlington F.C. players
Rangers F.C. players
FC Sion players
Palermo F.C. players
Norwich City F.C. players
Çaykur Rizespor footballers
Birmingham City F.C. players
Sunderland A.F.C. players
Sarpsborg 08 FF players
Reggina 1914 players
English Football League players
Scottish Premier League players
Swiss Super League players
Serie B players
Süper Lig players
Premier League players
Expatriate footballers in Switzerland
Expatriate footballers in Italy
Expatriate footballers in Turkey
Association football forwards
People educated at Devenish College
People from Enniskillen
Expatriate sportspeople from Northern Ireland in Turkey
Expatriate sportspeople from Northern Ireland in Switzerland
Expatriate sportspeople from Northern Ireland in Italy
UEFA Euro 2016 players
Heart of Midlothian F.C. players
Scottish Professional Football League players
Eliteserien players
Kilmarnock F.C. players
Anorthosis Famagusta F.C. players
Expatriate sportspeople from Northern Ireland in Cyprus
Expatriate footballers in Cyprus